This article lists the governors and other administrators of Dominica (where known), during its time as a colony of the Kingdom of Great Britain (1761–1778; 1784–1800), the Kingdom of France (1778–1784), and the United Kingdom (1800–1978).

Governors (1761–1833)

British rule (1761–1778)
 1761–1763: The Lord Rollo
 1763–1765: Robert Melvill
 1765–1767: George Scott (acting)
 1768–1773: Sir William Young
 1773–1774: William Stewart
 1774–1778: Thomas Shirley
 1778: William Stewart (acting)

French rule (1778–1784)
 1778–1781: Marie-Charles, Marquis du Chilleau
 1781–1782: Comte de Bourgon
 1782–1784: M. de Beaupré

British rule (1784–1833)
 1784–1792: Sir John Orde
 1789–1790: Thomas Bruce (acting)
 1792–1794: Thomas Bruce (acting)
 1794–1796: Henry Hamilton
 1796–1797: John Matson (acting)
 1797–1802: Andrew James Cochrane Johnstone
 1802–1805: George Prévost
 1805–1808: George Metcalfe (acting)
 1808: Edward Barnes
 1808–1809: James Montgomerie
 1809–1812: Edward Barnes
 1812–1813: John Corlet (acting)
 1813–1814: George Robert Ainslie
 1814–1816: Benjamin Lucas (acting)
 1816: Robert Reid (acting)
 1816–1819: Charles William Maxwell
 1819–1820: Robert Reid (acting)
 1820–1821: Samuel Ford Whittingham
 1821–1822: Robert Reid (acting)
 1822–1824: The Earl of Huntingdon
 1824: William Bremner (acting)
 1824–1830: William Nicolay
 1827–1828: John Laidlaw (acting)
 1830–1832: James Potter Lockhart (acting)
 1832–1833: Evan John Murray MacGregor

Lieutenant-Governors (1833–1872)
In 1833, following the creation of the Federal Colony of the Leeward Islands, Dominica's governor was replaced by a lieutenant-governor, subordinate to the Governor-in-Chief of the Leeward Islands.
 1833–1835: Charles Marsh Schomberg
 1835–1837: James Potter Lockhart (acting)
 1837–1838: Henry Light
 1838: John Longley
 1838–1839: S. Bridgewater (acting)
 1839–1843: John Macphail
 1843–1845: Dugald Stewart Laidlaw (acting)
 1845–1851: George McDonald
 1851–1857: Samuel Wensley Blackall
 1857–1861: Harry St. George Ord (acting from 1860)
 1860–1861: George Berkeley (acting)
 1861–1864: Thomas Price
 1865: William Cleaver Francis Robinson (acting)
 1865–1867: James Robert Longden
 1867–1869: Henry Ernest Gascoyne Bulwer (acting)
 1869–1871: Sanford Freeling
 1871–1872: Neale Porter (acting)

Presidents (1872–1895)
In 1872, the lieutenant-governor was replaced by a president, who remained subordinate to the Governor-in-Chief of the Leeward Islands.
 1872–1873: Alexander Wilson Moir
 1873–1882: Charles Monroe Eldridge
 1882–1887: James Meade
 1887–1894: George Ruthven Le Hunte
 1894–1895: Edward Baynes (acting)

Administrators (1895–1967)
In 1895, the president was replaced by an administrator, who remained subordinate to the Governor-in-Chief of the Leeward Islands until 1940, when Dominica was transferred to the Windward Islands Colony. From 1940 to 1958, the administrator was subordinate to the Governor of the Windward Islands. From 1958 to 1962, the administrator was subordinate to the Governor-General of the West Indies Federation.
 1895–1899: Philip Arthur Templer
 1899–1905: Henry Hesketh Joudou Bell
 1905–1914: William Douglas Young (acting from 1913)
 1914: Edward Rawle Drayton
 1915–1919: Arthur William Mahaffy
 1919–1923: Robert Walter
 1923–1924: Wilfred Bennett Davidson-Houston (acting)
 1924–1930: Edward Carlyon Eliot
 1927–1928: Herbert Walter Peebles (acting)
 1930–1931: Thomas Edwin Percival Baynes (acting)
 1931–1933: Walter Andrew Bowring
 1933–1937: Henry Bradshaw Popham
 1937–1938: Thomas Edwin Percival Baynes (acting)
 1938–1946: James Scott Neill (acting from 1945)
 1946–1952: Edwin Porter Arrowsmith
 1952–1959: Henry Laurence Lindo
 1960–1964: Alec Lovelace
 1965–1967: Geoffrey Colin Guy

Governors (1967–1978)
In 1967, the administrator was replaced by a governor, following Dominica's designation as an Associated State.
 1967: Geoffrey Colin Guy
 1967–1978: Sir Louis Cools-Lartigue

See also
 List of presidents of Dominica

References
 Rulers.org
 World Statesmen

Colonial governors
Dominica
Dominica
Dominica
Colonial governors
Dominica